"No Llores" (Don't Cry) is a song recorded by Cuban-American singer Gloria Estefan for her fourth Spanish-language and eleventh studio album, 90 Millas. It features additional work with popular Latin music performers such as guitarists Carlos Santana and José Feliciano, Sheila E. playing the timbales, and Arturo Sandoval on trumpet (uncredited). The song was written by Gloria Estefan and her husband, Emilio Estefan Jr. and Gaitanes (Alberto y Ricardo Gaitan), while production was credited to Estefan Jr. and Gaitanes. The single was released by SonyBMG on June 18, 2007 digitally worldwide as the lead single from 90 Millas.

With strong Latin rhythms in the background, the song is a danzón that mixes some elements of popular pop music with Cuban rhythms, interpolating guitar sounds in two different ways: acoustic by Feliciano and Santana's traditional electric guitar sound. Upon its release, the song received critical acclaim, describing that Estefan Spanish-language solo musical efforts were often her best performances since she left the Miami Sound Machine.

Commercially, the single was a success, becoming on Estefan's fourteenth number-one song on the "Hot Latin Songs" chart, extending her record as the female artist with most number one hits on the chart. An accompanying music video was premiered to support the single; the song was also remixed to fit different formats, collaborations with some rappers were added, which included: Wisin & Yandel and Pitbull. Gloria received a Billboard Latin Music Award for the song in the category "Top Tropical Airplay Of The Year - Female" at the ceremony held in 2008.

Distribution
The single was commercially released on June 18, 2007 digitally around the world at iTunes music store. The song with strong Latin rhythms, became popular, mostly because was a return to Hispanic radio-stations at the United States since her album Unwrapped, which featured the smash hits "Hoy" and "Tu Fotografía", both #1 Latin hits stateside.

Several remixes were commissioned to fit different formats:  a reggaeton remix was added on the special edition of the album stateside and the UK, featuring rap duo, Wisin & Yandel; a hip-hop style remix, which was made available to iTunes music store, featured Cuban rapper Pitbull. There was also a salsa remix included on the promotional singles sent to radio-stations and Spanish DJ, Mac Devila, created two house remixes that were released only to the Netherlands.

The song was used to promote the telephone company AT&T in the United States.

Chart performance 
In the United States, "No Llores" debuted on the Billboard charts in the Latin Pop Airplay at the Top 30, and also appeared on the "Hot Latin Tropical/Salsa Airplay" chart, reaching the top spot in its third week. The song debuted at number thirty-nine on the "Hot Latin Tracks" chart, and reached number one on the chart the week of August 30. The song debuted at the "Hot Latin Regional Mexican Airplay" chart at number thirty-four in its first week and peaked at number twenty-one. At the end of 2007, No Llores was listed on the Billboard Year-End Charts under "Hot Tropical Songs Of The Year" at #15. However it became her first lead single from a Spanish-language album, to not feature at the Billboard Hot 100 chart.

Internationally the song had moderate success, by reaching Top 10 position at Mexico's Top Latino chart, but reaching number sixty-four at Monitor Latino 100, Mexico's most important chart. With a similar peak, the song was able to peak at sixty-seven at the Chile's major singles chart. However was a Top 10 hit at the Latin American Top 40 chart and at a Top 20 at the Top Ibero-American chart.

Music video
A music video for the song was made to increase promotion for the song, like often Estefan's husband, producer and director, Emilio Estefan Jr. was in charge of the direction of the music video, which was shot at New York city on April 4, 2007. The video had an official premiere at Univision's news program, Primer Impacto on June 27, 2007, which featured a behind-the-scenes special and the complete music video at the very end of the show.

The video, which was very simple in comparison to other previous work, was filmed in a sepia tones and features Gloria singing with the same Panama hat that she wears on the single. Footage of the performing musicians appears throughout the video, including José Feliciano playing the guitar, Sheila E. at the timbales, and Arturo Sandoval on trumpet.

Formats and track listings 
These are the formats and track listings of major single releases of "No Llores".

Digital download
"No Llores" (featuring Carlos Santana, José Feliciano and Sheila E.) – 4:13

CD single
"No Llores" (featuring Carlos Santana, José Feliciano and Sheila E.) – 4:13

Netherlands 12 Vinyl Single
"No Llores" (Mac Devila Vocal Remix) – 9:18
"No Llores" (Mac Devila Dub Remix) – 9:18

Digital download - Hip-Hop Remix
"No Llores" (featuring Pitbull) – 3:53

US CD Remixes
"No Llores" (featuring Carlos Santana, José Feliciano and Sheila E.) – 4:13
"No Llores" (featuring Pitbull) [Hip-Hop Remix] – 3:53
"No Llores" (Hip-Hop Remix) – 3:10
"No Llores" (featuring Wisin & Yandel) [Reggaeton Remix] – 3:59

Credits and personnel 

 Gloria M. Estefan – writer, vocals and mixing
 Emilio Estefan Jr. – writer, record producer and mixing
 Alberto Gaitan – writer, record producer, background vocals and maracas
 Ricardo Gaitan – writer, record producer, background vocals and maracas
 Cheito Quiñonez - background vocals
 Carlos Santana – electric guitar
 José Feliciano – acoustic guitar
 Sheila E. – timbales
 Paquito Hechavarría – piano
 Marco Linares – guitar and cuatro

 Jesús Cruz – laúd
 Sal Cuevas – bass
 Luis Enrique –  congas & bongos
 Edwin Bonilla – minor percussion
 Hernan "Teddy" Mulet – trumpets
 Braily Ramos – trombones
 Danny Ponce & Mike Couzzi – tracking engineers
 Eric Schilling - mixing
 Recorded at Crescent Moon Studios, Miami, Florida.

Credits adapted from the liner notes of the 90 Millas CD and "No Llores" CD single .

Charts

Weekly charts

Official versions 
Original versions
 Album version  — 4:09 (Featuring Carlos Santana, José Feliciano and Sheila E.)

Remixes
 Salsa remix  — 4:31
 Hip-Hop remix  — 3:50 (Featuring Pitbull)
 Reggaeton remix  — 3:56 (Featuring Wisin & Yandel)
 Mac Devila vocal remix — 9:18 
 Mac Devila dub remix — 9:18

Release history

References

External links
Lyrics with English translation
 Gloria Estefan Discography Database
Gloria Estefan MySpace
Gloria Estefan Mexico.com
90millas.com

Spanish-language songs
2007 singles
Gloria Estefan songs
Songs written by Ricardo Gaitan
Songs written by Alberto Gaitan
Songs written by Gloria Estefan
Songs written by Emilio Estefan
2007 songs
Song recordings produced by Emilio Estefan